Noxxon Pharma is a biotechnology company founded in 1997 in Berlin, Germany and is focused on improving cancer treatment by targeting the tumor microenvironment. Noxxon Pharma N.V. is listed on Euronext Growth, Paris (ALNOX). The company is a member of the German Association of Research-Based Pharmaceutical Companies, Verband forschender Arzneimittelhersteller (vfa). 

Noxxon Pharma develops drugs using technology yielding L-RNA molecules, which are of mirror-image configuration compared to natural occurring D-RNA molecules. The company calls these agents Spiegelmers, from Spiegel, the German word for "mirror."

The L-RNA are resistant to the natural RNA nuclease enzymes.

Products 
While no Spiegelmer is on the market yet, some candidates are in clinical trials. 

A Spiegelmer (NOX-A12, olaptesed pegol) is under development as a combination therapy for a number of cancer indications. NOX-A12 targets CXCL12 (C-X-C Chemokine Ligand 12), a key chemokine protein. Favorable results were reported in October 2018 during the 4th CRI-CIMT-EATI-AACR International Cancer Immunotherapy Conference in New York, NY, USA.

A different Spiegelmer (NOX-E36, emapticap pegol) has been tested for the treatment of a progressive kidney disease in diabetics, Diabetic nephropathy. Favorable results were reported in June 2014 in a company press release. NOX-E36 targets MCP-1, also called CCL2. 
 
A third Spiegelmer (NOX-H94, lexaptepid pegol) has been in a clinical trial for the treatment of Anemia of chronic disease.

References 

Biotechnology companies of Germany
Pharmaceutical companies of Germany
German brands
Pharmaceutical companies established in 1997
Biotechnology companies established in 1997
German companies established in 1997
Medical and health organisations based in Berlin